Garry John Martin (born 1948 in Burton upon Trent) is a British novelist. He attended the local grammar school and art college and went on to read English at Emmanuel College, Cambridge.

Biography
On graduation he was selected to take part in a BBC documentary charting the lives of graduates.
This was followed up a decade later in 1980 with a programme in which Martin discussed his novel To Weave a Rainbow, then under the working title Snake or Snapdragon. By this time he had already worked in the City as a systems analyst and taken a year long trip halfway round the world by yacht (a journey he documented in a series of articles for Yachting and Boating Weekly) worked as a teacher at Brentwood School, Essex and at King Edward's School, Birmingham. At the time of the 1980 interview he was planning to open a restaurant, ‘Blythe’s’, in Coleshill.

In an interview given to the school magazine at King Edward's, Birmingham, Martin is asked,
‘Do you think of yourself as a teacher who writes or a writer who teaches?’ He replies,
‘A writer who teaches: I don’t think that the two are incompatible. If I’m actively involved in the craft of writing, what I learn is useful in my teaching.

It was at King Edward’s that he found himself teaching Jonathan Coe, later to become an award winning novelist. Coe has commented, ‘I believe I was about seventeen years old when I first read The Life and Opinions of Tristram Shandy, Gentleman. For this I have to thank my English teacher, Garry Martin. He was always a good judge of other people’s taste and I could see the gleam of satisfaction in his eye as, describing to me this strange eighteenth-century novel full of black pages and narrative non sequiturs, he saw my own eyes light up.’

By the time To Weave a Rainbow was published (1986) he was running a bookshop as well as the restaurant while spending his free time writing. This, his first novel was well received, ‘Garry Martin writes with a rare incisiveness, coupled with the ability to reflect the very ordinary happenings of day-to-day life with remarkably keen perception.’

He then, having sold his two businesses, returned to full-time teaching/writing taking up a post at Cranleigh School as writer-in-residence.  According to Mike Smith, '. . . these were turbulent times for him, not only because he was undergoing a divorce, but also because he had accepted a request from a friend to help in a mission to Kurdish Iraq in the immediate aftermath of the first Gulf War. He narrowly escaped capture whilst he was there, but managed to file dispatches for the BBC World Service and to write A Sane Asylum, a novel based on his journal of the trip.’

On his return he moved to his final teaching post, at Nottingham High School. Here he focussed on Oxbridge entrance candidates and continued his writing. Robert Macfarlane, a pupil at this time, has commented, ‘Every so often you meet a teacher who changes your life as the adverts say. Garry Martin was that person for me.’

A radio interview given in 2005 shows him as an active and engaged teacher working on directing an imaginative school performance of Look Back in Anger.

The High School gave Martin an extended spring break to allow him to visit India to research a book on avatars. ‘In fact, he returned with the germ of a story to be called The Boy Who Made God Smile.’

The setting of each novel, whether in a city or a landscape, is so powerfully evoked as to function as a character within the work. Hence ‘Being There’ – a sense of place in the novels of G J Martin – was the subject of a presentation at the Derby Book Festival. The description of the islands of Colonsay and Oronsay were seen to be as important to the themes of ‘Of Love and Gravity’  as the characters who inhabit them.

G.J.Martin's magnum opus, his ‘Orcadian Trilogy’ was launched in the Orkney Library and Archive in Kirkwall in June 2019. The result of ten years research and six years writing, the books imagine the adventures of the Dons of Westray, an improbable, hybrid race, made up of nervous, oppressed islanders and a ship's boat full of strangers cast aside at the furthest edge of a war. The stories span the years from the last days of the Spanish Armada to the end of the Scottish earls’ dominion over the northern isles. This was a time when the Thames froze over, the Hansa towns declined, the Spanish empire dissolved and the age of chivalry died. Led by a young Spanish lord, full of ideals and memories of honour, the Dons of Westray dare all; determined to survive.

As a teacher Martin has an astonishing array of talent as former pupils, not only Jonathan Coe and Robert Macfarlane but also journalists Andrew Billen, Mark Steyn, Dave Haslam and men of the media Mark Keen and Ian Hunter, among many others. However teaching has never deflected him from his primary purpose, as is apparent from comments made recently to Alan Clifford: ‘I’ve always had a novel in progress,’ and to Amanda Penman: ‘I was once asked why I write and I simply replied “because I’m a writer.”’

Novels and short stories
To Weave a Rainbow   

Like a Fat Gold Watch (Amazon Kindle)

Cling (Amazon Kindle)

Beneath Napoleon’s Hat volume 1: Eagles without a Cliff    

Beneath Napoleon’s Hat volume 2: A Black Violet    

Beneath Napoleon’s Hat volume 3: Sylvia Beach and the Melancholy Jesus     

Patchwork    

The Boy Who Made God Smile    

A Sane Asylum    

Of Love and Gravity

Forthcoming publications

Orcadian Trilogy volume 1: Orcadian Armada
 
Orcadian Trilogy volume 2: The Spanish Barque

Orcadian Trilogy volume 3: Old Elizabeth and Black Patie

Showing the Novel

Plays
The Bar

Showing

Eating Seagull

Job with an Interpreter

Awards
The Boy Who Made God Smile, Writing East Midlands Mentoring Prize 2013.

References

External links
 http://www.writingeastmidlands.co.uk/writers-directory/garry-john-martin/
 http://nottinghamwritersstudio.co.uk/our-members/
 http://garrymartin.org.uk
 http://www.colleybooks.com

Living people
1948 births
English writers